Major-General Herbert William Jackson CB CSI DSO (9 June 1872 – 9 September 1940) was an officer of the British Indian Army.

Life 
Herbert William Jackson was the son of Major W.W. Jackson and was born on 9 June 1872. He was educated at Bedford Modern School and the Royal Military Academy, Sandhurst, where he graduated 81st in 1890.

He was gazetted as a 2nd Lieutenant in the Middlesex Regiment (Duke of Cambridge's own) in 1891. He transferred to the Indian Staff College in 1893 and joined the 17th Regiment of Madras Infantry. He saw active service in Burma (1895–96), China, the Western Front during World War I, Afghanistan (1919–20), East Persia and Waziristan. He was awarded the Distinguished Service Order in 1918. In 1920 he was appointed CSI and in 1925 was made CB.

Jackson married Eileen, daughter of Lt-General Sir R. Wapshire (Indian Army). They had one daughter. He retired from the Army in 1927 and settled in Cheltenham. Herbert William Jackson died on 9 September 1940.

References 

1872 births
1940 deaths
People educated at Bedford Modern School
Companions of the Order of the Bath
Companions of the Order of the Star of India
Companions of the Distinguished Service Order
British Army personnel of World War I